Boruzad (also Romanized as Borūzād) is a village in Nurabad Rural District, Garkan-e Jonubi District, Mobarakeh County, Isfahan Province, Iran. At the 2006 census, its population was 720, in 191 families.

References 

Populated places in Mobarakeh County